Spelaeoecia bermudensis is a species of ostracod in the family Deeveyidae.

The IUCN conservation status of Spelaeoecia bermudensis is "CR", critically endangered. The species faces an extremely high risk of extinction in the immediate future. The IUCN status was reviewed in 1996.

References

Halocyprida
Articles created by Qbugbot
Crustaceans described in 1987